Lonelyville may refer to:

 Lonelyville, New York, a community on Fire Island in Suffolk County, New York State, U.S.
 "Lonelyville" (Law & Order: Criminal Intent), an episode of Law & Order: Criminal Intent
 Lonelyville, an album by Dave Dudley